In the mathematical disciplines of in functional analysis and order theory, a Banach lattice  is a complete normed vector space with a lattice order, such that for all , the implication  holds, where the absolute value  is defined as

Examples and constructions 
Banach lattices are extremely common in functional analysis, and "every known example [in 1948] of a Banach space [was] also a vector lattice."  In particular:
 , together with its absolute value as a norm, is a Banach lattice.

Examples of non-lattice Banach spaces are now known; James' space is one such.

Properties 
The continuous dual space of a Banach lattice is equal to its order dual. 

Every Banach lattice admits a continuous approximation to the identity.

Abstract (L)-spaces
A Banach lattice satisfying the additional condition  is called an abstract (L)-space. The classical mean ergodic theorem and Poincaré recurrence generalize to abstract (L)-spaces.

See also

Footnotes

Bibliography

 
 
  
  

Functional analysis
Order theory